You Don't Forget Such a Girl (German: So ein Mädel vergißt man nicht) is a 1932 Austrian-German romantic comedy film directed by Fritz Kortner and starring Willi Forst, Dolly Haas, and Oskar Sima. The film was shot at the Halensee Studios in Berlin. It was the last film made by Kortner before he went into exile following the Nazi takeover of 1933.

Cast
 Willi Forst as Paul Hartwig  
 Dolly Haas as Lisa Brandes  
 Oskar Sima as Max Bach  
 Max Gülstorff as Herr Körner  
 Ida Wüst as Frau Körner  
 Theo Lingen as Hahnen Jr.  
 Paul Hörbiger as Direktor Leopold Schrader  
 Julius Falkenstein as Dr. Berger  
 Hans Hermann Schaufuß as Bornemann 
 Hans Leibelt as Hahnen Sr. 
 Hans Walden as  Agenturdirektor 
 Theodor Danegger  as Hausportier 
 Edwin Jürgensen as Ewald 
 Valeska Stock as Angebe Nebenrolle

References

Bibliography 
 Hake, Sabine. Popular Cinema of the Third Reich. University of Texas Press, 2001.

External links 
 

1932 films
1932 romantic comedy films
Austrian romantic comedy films
German romantic comedy films
Films of the Weimar Republic
1930s German-language films
Films directed by Fritz Kortner
German black-and-white films
Austrian black-and-white films
1930s German films
Films shot at Halensee Studios